The women's 200 metres event at the 1991 Pan American Games was held in Havana, Cuba with the final on 7 and 8 August.

Medalists

Results

Heats

Wind:Heat 1: +2.2 m/s, Heat 2: +2.6 m/s

Final
Wind: -1.3 m/s

References

Athletics at the 1991 Pan American Games
1991
Pan